Sharon Kay Nelson (born 1951) is an American politician from the state of Washington.

Background

Nelson is the former Chief of Staff to then King County Council Chair Dow Constantine.  She has long been a leader in the fight to protect Maury Island from the expansion of a gravel mine on the island's shore. Senator Nelson, a former Bank Executive, has lived on Maury Island since 1994 with her husband John. Sharon and John have two grown daughters, Amy and Lyssa Ann, and they live with their dog, Abby.

Political career 
She was first appointed to the State House of Representatives in 2007 following the elevation of Joe McDermott to the Senate.  Nelson was elected to State Senate in 2010, and was sworn in on December 2, 2010. In March 2018, Nelson announced that she would retire at the end of her term.

She was the Democratic Leader of the Washington State Senate, elected to that position by her colleagues in 2013.

Nelson represented the 34th Legislative District, which includes West Seattle, Vashon Island, Maury Island, and most of North Highline and Burien.

Awards
 2009 Fuse Sizzle Award - Intercontinental Smackdown Champion.
for her leadership in the Washington State Legislature and efforts to clean up the lending industry water pollution. Presented by Fuse.
 2009 Fuse Sizzle Award - Mother Jones. Presented by Fuse.

References

External links
 

|-

1951 births
Living people
21st-century American politicians
21st-century American women politicians
Democratic Party members of the Washington House of Representatives
Democratic Party Washington (state) state senators
Whitman College alumni
Women state legislators in Washington (state)